Thomas Robert Colman Dibdin (22 October 1810 – 26 December 1893) was an English water colour artist and teacher.

Biography

Dibdin was born in Betchworth, Surrey. He first worked in a post office. He became an artist at the age of 28 and travelled to France, Germany and Belgium.

He also did paintings in Gibraltar and India although the latter were created in England based on detailed sketches. In 1845 he published a guide to water colour painting.

Dibdin worked at Sydenham College later in life with his father in law. He died in Sydenham. His paintings can be seen in galleries in London and Sheffield.

References

External links
 
  engraved by John Charles Varrall for Fisher's Drawing Room Scrap Book, 1838 with a poetical illustration by Letitia Elizabeth Landon.

1810 births
1893 deaths
People from Surrey (before 1889)
19th-century English painters
English male painters
English watercolourists
19th-century English male artists